The following are the national records in track cycling in Uzbekistan, maintained by its national cycling federation, Uzbekistan Cycling Federation.

Men

Women

References

External links
Uzbekistan Cycling Federation

Uzbekistan
records
track cycling
track cycling